Sonny Fodera is an Australian house music DJ and producer currently based in London. Known for his vocal-driven, pop-forward songs, Fodera has released 5 albums.

He has collaborated and remixed artists such as Calvin Harris, Glass Animals, MK, Green Velvet, Diplo, Sinéad Harnett & Ella Eyre.

Career

Early career
Fodera grew up in Adelaide, Australia, where he began working on hip hop beats in his mid-teens. At age 18 he was inspired to start creating house music after seeing American DJ Derrick Carter perform at a nightclub. At 23 he began touring in the US and UK. DJ Gene Farris asked Fodera to remix his track "Dance Warriors" for Green Velvet's label Cajual Records, who released his first two albums Moving Forward in 2013 and After Parties & Aeroplanes in 2014. In 2013 MixMag named Fodera as one of their "Hot Six".

2016-2018: Frequently Flying
In early 2016, Fodera released an In The House compilation mix on Defected Records and completed a 30 date tour of the UK, US, and Australia. That summer Fodera performed at several festivals including EDC Las Vegas, Creamfields, and Hideout, and released his first Essential Mix for BBC Radio 1 in August. After releasing the single "You & I" in October, Fodera released his album Frequently Flying in November on Defected Records. Fodera promoted the album with a 16 date North American tour in November which included performances at EDC Orlando and Escape: Psycho Circus. That year Fodera reached #2 in the UK and Europe and #1 in Australia on the Beatport club DJ chart.

In early 2017 Fodera launched his record label Solotoko and released his single "Set Me Free" through it. In June Fodera released a deluxe version of Frequently Flying, followed by US and UK tours in October.

In 2018, Fodera performed at Splash House and Reading and Leeds festivals, as well as an 8 week headline residency at Cuckoo Land at Ibiza Rocks Hotel over the summer. That October Fodera released two remixes of Calvin Harris' "Promises".

2019-2020: Rise
After performances at CRSSD Festival and the DoLab stage at Coachella in March and April 2019, Fodera released his album Rise on Insomniac Records and Solotoko in July. That summer Fodera returned to Cuckoo Land for an 11 week headline residency, and performed on tour in the UK and in the US with Dom Dolla in the fall. Fodera also released his Vibrate EP with Biscits in October and single "One Night" with MK in November, which hit the Official Singles Chart and has since been certified silver in the UK.

In 2020, Fodera released the singles "Before U" with King Henry featuring AlunaGeorge in March, "Moving Blind" with Dom Dolla in March, and "Wired" featuring Ella Eyre and "Turn Back Time" with Diplo in November.

2021-present: Wide Awake
After remixing Glass Animals' "Heat Waves" in February and releasing his single "Nah" with Sinéad Harnett, Fodera released his album Wide Awake in October 2021.

In April 2022 Fodera released a deluxe version of Wide Awake with three additional tracks. The same month Fodera released the single "Need You" as part of Spotify's mint Singles series. Fodera will perform a 16 week residency at Amnesia in Ibiza with Gorgon City this summer.

References

External link 
Official website

Australian musicians
Australian DJs
Electronic musicians
House musicians
Living people
1980s births
Year of birth uncertain